The Asian Basketball Club Championship 1988 was the 3rd staging of the Asian Basketball Club Championship, the basketball club tournament of Asian Basketball Confederation. The tournament was held in Istora Senayan Stadium, Jakarta, Indonesia, April 9 to April 16, 1988.

Preliminary round

Final round

3rd place

Final

Final standing

References
Fibaasia.net

1988
Champions Cup
B
Basketball Asia Champions Cup 1988